The Camogli Hospital  is a public hospital located in Edinburgh of the Seven Seas on Tristan da Cunha. The building was replaced by a new build in 2017 to meet NHS standards.

History 
Throughout the 19th Century, the islands had no resident healthcare service. A temporary hospital was constructed in 1942. In 1971, the Camogli hospital was constructed, and was named after the hometown of Italian settlers Andrea Repetto & Gaetano Lavarello.

On 7 June 2017 a new facility, named the Camogli Medical Centre, was constructed, meeting current NHS standards.

Services 
The hospital provides two hospital wards, each containing a bed, with the capability to hold two. The facility also features an Emergency room, X-Ray, ambulance service, and dental services.

See also 

 History of Tristan da Cunha

References 

NHS hospitals
Hospitals established in 1971
Hospital buildings completed in 1971
Tristan da Cunha
Buildings and structures in Edinburgh of the Seven Seas